Ismat/Esmat ( or )  is a mainly male given name meaning purity, chastity or modesty and in classical Arabic infallibility, immaculate, impeccability, faultlessness. Transliteration variants include Esmat and Asmat.

Female given name
Ismat Chughtai (1915–1991), Indian Urdu writer
Esmat Dowlatshahi (1904–1995), Iranian aristocrat and the fourth and last spouse of Reza Shah
Ismat Jahan (born 1960), Bangladeshi diplomat
Esmat Mansour (born 1986), Egyptian weightlifter
Ismat Ara Nishi, Bangladeshi Kabaddi player
Aisha 'Esmat al-Taymuriyya or Aisha Taymur (1840–1902), Egyptian social activist, poet, novelist, and feminist 
Ismat Zaidi, Pakistani actress

Male given name
Ismat Abasov (born 1954), Azerbaijani politician
Ismat Abdel-Rahman, Sudanese Army officer
Ismat Beg, (born 1951), Pakistani mathematician
Ismat Gayibov (1942–1991), Public Prosecutor General of Azerbaijan
Ismat T. Kittani (1929–2001), Iraqi politician
Esmat Shanwary (born 1993), Afghan-Dutch footballer

Middle name
Ahmed Asmat Abdel-Meguid (1924–2013), Egyptian diplomat

Surname
Riad Ismat (1947–2020), Syrian dramatist and playwright

See also
Ismet, Turkish spelling of the same name
Ismat ad-Din (disambiguation)
Ismatullah

References

Arabic unisex given names
Arabic-language surnames
Pakistani unisex given names